Karl Bernard Mecklenburg (born September 1, 1960), nicknamed "the Albino Rhino", is a former football linebacker for the Denver Broncos in the National Football League (NFL).

National Football League
In 1983, the Denver Broncos drafted Karl Mecklenburg in the 12th round with the 310th pick overall. In spite of his low selection, Mecklenburg went on to become an integral part of the Broncos' Super Bowl teams of the 1980s.  He played in six Pro Bowls. His 79 sacks is the third highest total in franchise history; he is one of only three Broncos with four sacks in a game, and the only one to do so twice. In 2001, during half time of a game against the Baltimore Ravens, he and Dennis Smith were inducted into the Denver Broncos Ring of Fame. He is also in the Colorado Sports Hall of Fame and serves on the Broncos Alumni Council.

Since retiring from pro football in 1994, Mecklenburg divides his time between family, motivational speaking, and his ongoing charity involvements. Karl and his wife Kathi have three children. The Mecklenburgs reside in Littleton, Colorado.  The son of Fred Mecklenburg and Marjory Mecklenburg, Karl has two brothers, Eric and Fred, and a sister, Carol.

Mecklenburg is considered one of the greatest Denver Broncos of all time, according to NFL Films top 10 Denver Broncos of All Time.

Concussions
Mecklenburg suffered "at least a dozen +10 concussions" during his football career. By his early fifties, Mecklenburg was experiencing cognitive issues, including memory impairment, which he attributes to the concussions he sustained.

Mecklenburg was a plaintiff in concussion-related litigation against the NFL: "I didn't buy in to professional football with the understanding that I was going to have brain damage. I expected to have a limp. I expected to have sore joints. Bad shoulder, whatever. But that other part, that was kept from us and that wasn't right."

Video games

The digital version of Mecklenburg anchored the 3–4 defense of the Denver Broncos in the NES video games Tecmo Bowl (1989) and Tecmo Super Bowl (1991). Mecklenburg appears in the video game Madden NFL 15 (2014) in the Ultimate Team mode, as a 97 Overall player.

Charity work
Mecklenburg has been the Broncos representative for Taste of the NFL, started For Mercy Sake Sackem, started The Karl Mecklenburg's REACH foundation, has been a board member for Colorado Youth Outdoors, hosted charity celebrity ski races in Durango and in Aspen, worked with Project Healing Waters, and has served as an assistant Scout Master.  Karl says, "I take the opportunity and responsibility to work with charities very seriously".

References

External links
Mecklenburg's stats
Karl Mecklenburg's REACH Foundation

1960 births
American Conference Pro Bowl players
American football linebackers
Denver Broncos players
Living people
Minnesota Golden Gophers football players
People from the Denver metropolitan area
Players of American football from Seattle